Karl Magnussen (21 April 1915 – 10 April 1966) was a Danish cyclist. He competed in the sprint and the team pursuit events at the 1936 Summer Olympics.

References

External links
 

1915 births
1966 deaths
People from Rudersdal Municipality
Danish male cyclists
Olympic cyclists of Denmark
Cyclists at the 1936 Summer Olympics
Sportspeople from the Capital Region of Denmark